David L. Mills (born June 3, 1938) is an American computer engineer and Internet pioneer.

Education 
Mills earned his PhD in Computer and Communication Sciences from the University of Michigan in 1971. While at Michigan he worked on the ARPA sponsored Conversational Use of Computers (CONCOMP) project and developed DEC PDP-8 based hardware and software to allow terminals to be connected over phone lines to an IBM 360 mainframe.

Career 
In 1977, Mills began working at COMSAT. There he worked on synchronizing the clocks of computers connected to ARPANET, inventing the Network Time Protocol. He told The New Yorker in 2022 that he enjoyed working on synchronized time because no one else was working on it, giving him his own "little fief". In the mid-2000s, Mills turned over full control of the NTP reference implementation to Harlan Stenn.

Mills was the chairman of the Gateway Algorithms and Data Structures Task Force (GADS) and the first chairman of the Internet Architecture Task Force. He invented the DEC LSI-11 based Fuzzball router that was used for the 56 kbit/s NSFNET (1985), inspired the author of ping for BSD (1983), and had the first FTP implementation. He has authored numerous RFCs.

In 1999 he was inducted as a Fellow of the Association for Computing Machinery, and in 2002, he was inducted as a Fellow of the Institute of Electrical and Electronics Engineers (IEEE). In 2008, Mills was elected a member of the National Academy of Engineering (NAE) for contributions to Internet timekeeping and the development of the Network Time Protocol. In 2013 he received the IEEE Internet Award "For significant leadership and sustained contributions in the research, development, standardization, and deployment of quality time synchronization capabilities for the Internet."

Mills is an emeritus professor at the University of Delaware, where he was a full professor from 1986 to 2008. He also holds an adjunct appointment at Delaware so that he can continue to teach.

Personal life 
Mills is an amateur radio operator, callsign W3HCF.

Mills has glaucoma, but a surgeon saved some of the vision in his left eye when he was a kid. He attended a school in San Mateo, California, for the visually impaired. His vision began degrading around 2012 and by 2022 he was fully blind.

References

External links

A Maze of Twisty, Turney Passages - Routing in the Internet Swamp. Lecture by David L. Mills at the University of Delaware. Given on May 26, 2005. 
Oral history interview with David L. Mills, Charles Babbage Institute, University of Minnesota.  Interview covers Mills' invention of Network Time Protocol, his chairing the Internet Architecture Task Force, and interactions with colleagues including Vinton Cerf, David D. Clark, Jon Postel, Peter Kirstein, and David Farber.
The Thorny Problem of Keeping the Internet’s Time, New Yorker article by Nate Hopper. Popular article on NTP, covering some of the contribution and life of David Mills.

1938 births
Living people
University of Delaware faculty
American computer scientists
Fellows of the Association for Computing Machinery
Amateur radio people
Internet pioneers
University of Michigan alumni
Members of the United States National Academy of Engineering